Datia Airstrip is a small airstrip located in the state of Madhya Pradesh, India. The airstrip does not have any scheduled services and is mainly used by private aircraft and air taxis. There are plans to open a flight school at the airstrip.

References

Airports in Madhya Pradesh
Transport in Madhya Pradesh
Year of establishment missing